The 2018 NCAA Division III women's basketball tournament was the 37th annual tournament hosted by the NCAA to determine the national champion of Division III women's collegiate basketball in the United States.

Defending champions Amherst defeated Bowdoin in the championship game, 65–45, to claim the Lord Jeffs' third Division III national title.

The championship rounds were hosted at the Mayo Civic Center in Rochester, Minnesota.

Bracket

Final Four

All-tournament team
 Hannah Fox, Amherst
 Emma McCarthy, Amherst
 Kate Kerrigan, Bowdoin
 Madison Temple, Thomas More
 Katie Sommer, Wartburg

See also
 2018 NCAA Division I women's basketball tournament
 2018 NCAA Division II women's basketball tournament
 2018 NAIA Division I women's basketball tournament
 2018 NAIA Division II women's basketball tournament
 2018 NCAA Division III men's basketball tournament

References

 
NCAA Division III women's basketball tournament
2018 in sports in Minnesota